The United States’ relationship with the Arab League prior to the Second World War was limited. However, the first country to officially recognize the US was Morocco. Moreover, in comparison to European powers such as Britain and France which had managed to colonise almost all of the Arab World after defeating the Ottoman Empire in 1918, the United States was ‘popular and respected throughout the region’.  Indeed, ‘Americans were seen as good people, untainted by the selfishness and duplicity associated with the Europeans’.  American missionaries had brought modern medicine and set up educational institutions all over the Arab World.  In addition to this, the US had provided the Arab states with highly skilled petroleum engineers.  Thus, there were some connections, which were made between the United States and the Arab states before the Second World War. All in all, the American-Arab relations have had their ups and downs, with each conflict changing the relations. At the moment, Arab–American relations are very strong economically, where the Arab world is the third largest exporter to the US, and the US is the first largest importer in the Arab world. Nevertheless, these strong economic relations fail to show in the political arena.

Arab-Israeli Conflict

The first real incident of deterioration between the Arab world and the US was when the US recognized Israel, and supported it in the United Nations. This issue has decreased the US's reputation and role within the Arab streets, hate towards the US increased, and the US was seen as the 'Friend of the Arabs Enemy,' Israel, thus becoming the Enemy.

First Persian Gulf War

The war between Iran and Iraq was another step in Arab–American relations, where the US strongly supported Iraq in its war against the Islamic Republic of Iran. Among major powers, the United States' policy was to "tilt" toward Iraq by reopening diplomatic channels, lifting restrictions on the export of dual-use technology, overseeing the transfer of third party military hardware, and providing operational intelligence on the battlefield.

Second Persian Gulf War

The US role in the Gulf War was very significant. When Iraq decided to invade another Arab country, Kuwait, several Arab states decided to enter to free Kuwait; the US adopted these States, and headed the coalition forces, which gave the US the image of a liberator, especially among the rich Arab states of Saudi Arabia, UAE, Bahrain, Qatar and Kuwait. The US currently has several Military bases in these states.

11th September

Iraq War

The Arab League unanimously condemned the war, with the exception of Kuwait.  Saudi Foreign Minister Prince Saud publicly claimed that the U.S. military would not be authorized to use Saudi Arabia's soil in any way to attack Iraq. However, this was later revealed to have been a front, as Saudi Arabia, Kuwait, and some other Arab states did, in fact, provide support to American troops, but they did not wish to risk offending Saddam pre-war by making those statements publicly.() After ten years of U.S. presence in Saudi Arabia, cited among reasons by Saudi-born Osama bin Laden for his September 11, 2001 al-Qaeda attacks on America, most of U.S. forces were withdrawn from Saudi Arabia in 2003. For the duration of the war, the Saudi public remained strongly against the US action, regardless of a UN mandate. Prior to the war, the government repeatedly attempted to find a diplomatic solution, generally agreeing with the US position on Saddam's menace, even going so far as to urge Saddam to go into voluntary exile—a suggestion that angered him a great deal.

Anti-Arabism
 William A. Dorman, writing in the compedium The United States and the Middle East: A Search for New Perspectives (1992) notes that, in the United States,  "anti-Semitism is no longer socially acceptable, at least among the educated classes. No such social sanctions exist for anti-Arabism."

In the mid-1970s, a prominent Russian-born American libertarian author, scholar and philosopher, Ayn Rand, advocated strong anti-Arab sentiment following the Arab-Israeli War of 1973: "The Arabs are one of the least developed cultures. They are typically nomads. Their culture is primitive, and they resent Israel because it's the sole beachhead of modern science and civilization on their continent. When you have civilized men fighting savages, you support the civilized men, no matter who they are."

During the 1991 Gulf War, anti-Arab sentiments increased in the United States. Arab Americans have experienced a backlash as result of terrorist attacks, including events where Arabs were not involved, like the Oklahoma City bombing, and the explosion of TWA Flight 800. According to a report prepared by the Arab American Institute, three days after the Oklahoma City bombing "more than 200 serious hate crimes were committed against Arab Americans and American Muslims. The same was true in the days following September 11."

According to a 2001 poll of Arab Americans conducted by the Arab American Institute, 32% of Arab Americans reported having been subjected to some form of ethnic-based discrimination during their lifetimes, while 20% reported having experienced an instance of ethnic-based discrimination since September 11. Of special concern, for example, is the fact that 45% of students and 37% of Arab Americans of the Muslim faith report being targeted by discrimination since September 11.

According to the FBI and Arab groups, the number of attacks against Arabs, Muslims, and others mistaken as such rose considerably after the 9/11 attacks. Hate crimes against people of Middle Eastern origin or descent increased from 354 attacks in 2000, to 1,501 attacks in 2001. Among the victims of the backlash was a Middle Eastern man in Houston, Texas who was shot and wounded after an assailant accused him of "blowing up the country" and four immigrants shot and killed by a man named Larme Price who confessed to killing them as "revenge" for the September 11 attacks.

Anti-Americanism

For the most part, it is the rise of alternatives, ushered in by modernization, that threatens traditional societies and generates anti-American reaction. The stability of traditional society (like that of modern totalitarian systems) rests on the lack of alternatives, on the lack of choice. Choice is deeply subversive-culturally, politically, psychologically.

The recent outburst of murderous anti- Americanism has added a new dimension to the phenomenon, or at any rate, throws into relief the intense hatred it may encapsulate. The violence of September 11 shows that when anti-Americanism is nurtured by the kind of indignation and resentment that in [turn] is stimulated and sanctioned by religious convictions, it can become spectacularly destructive."

In 2002 and in mid-2004 Zogby International polled the favorable/unfavorable ratings of the U.S. in Saudi Arabia, Egypt, Jordan, Lebanon, Morocco and the United Arab Emirates. In Zogby's 2002 survey, 76% of Egyptians had a negative attitude toward the United States, compared with 98% in 2004. In Morocco, 61% viewed the country unfavorably in 2002, but in two years following the U.S invasion of Iraq, that number has jumped to 88 percent. In Saudi Arabia, such responses rose from 87% in 2002 to 94% in June. Attitudes were virtually unchanged in Lebanon but improved slightly in the UAE, from 87% who said in 2002 that they disliked the United States to 73% in 2004.  However most of these countries mainly objected to foreign policies that they considered unfair.

See also
Arab–Iranian conflict
Arab lobby in the United States
Arab American Institute
Arab American Community

References

 
United States
Arab League
United States–Middle Eastern relations